Guy Sigsworth is an English record producer and songwriter. During his career, he has worked with many artists, including Seal, Björk, Goldie, Madonna, Britney Spears, Kate Havnevik, Imogen Heap, Bebel Gilberto, Mozez, David Sylvian, Alanis Morissette, Eric Whitacre, Alison Moyet, and AURORA . He has also collaborated with many celebrated instrumental musicians, including Talvin Singh, Jon Hassell, and Lester Bowie. He was previously a member of the band Frou Frou together with Imogen Heap.

Early life

Sigsworth grew up in Ilkley, where he developed a youthful passion for early music, especially the 14th-century composer Guillaume de Machaut. His earliest musical heroes were the multi-instrumentalist David Munrow and the maverick field recordist and composer David Fanshawe. He was a pupil at Leeds Grammar School in the 1970s. He studied the harpsichord, first at summer schools at the Casa de Mateus in Portugal, and later for a year at the Utrechts Conservatorium in the Netherlands. He toured Europe playing harpsichord for the European Union Baroque Orchestra.

Sigsworth has worked with various engineers and programmers of distinction. During the late 1990s, he worked with Damian Taylor, who has since engineered, programmed, and performed live with Björk; in the early 2000s, he worked with Sean McGhee, who has since produced Temposhark; and most recently, he has worked extensively with Andy Page, who has previously worked with Sasha, BT, and Harry Gregson-Williams.

Career

Seal
After returning to the UK, Sigsworth moved to London and made a sudden change of direction. He became fascinated with the burgeoning acid house sound, and immediately bought a Roland sampler and an Atari computer. He met musician Seal, co-writing four songs on his debut album: "Crazy", "The Beginning", "Wild", and "Violet", plus the B-side, "Sparkle". The album's producer, Trevor Horn, was the first pop record producer Sigsworth had ever met.

Bomb the Bass / Hector Zazou
Tim Simenon was also involved in work on Seal's song "Crazy", and Sigsworth soon became part of the regular production team of Simenon's band, Bomb the Bass, co-writing the UK No. 7 hit single "Winter in July". He also worked with Simenon on Hector Zazou's 1992 album Sahara Blue, performing alongside celebrated French actor Gérard Depardieu on the track "I'll Strangle You". Sigsworth subsequently contributed to Zazou's 1994 album Chansons des mers froides, accompanying Björk.

Talvin Singh
While working on sessions for Japanese drummer/producer Gota Yashiki, Sigsworth met virtuoso tabla player Talvin Singh. He subsequently played synthesizer and harpsichord for Singh's live shows, and later played and contributed remixes on Singh's debut album, OK.

"Survival Game"
In 1993, Sigsworth produced the benefit
song "Survival Game" for the relief organization Menschen für Menschen in Ethiopia, founded by actor Karlheinz Böhm. The song was written by Mike Turtle and Dean Frederick. The track was later remixed by Paul Dakeyne and hit the charts in South America and Europe.

Björk
While working with Talvin Singh, Sigsworth met Björk, becoming keyboard player, and later music director, of her live band for two albums. Sigsworth brought his early music sensibility to Björk's live performances and recordings, adding harpsichord, clavichord, regal, and positive organ accompaniments to her music. His harpsichord can be heard on the song "Cover Me" from the album Post; the clavichord on the song "All Is Full of Love"; and organ on the "Unravel" from Homogenic. "Unravel" was Sigsworth's first co-written song with Björk. Sigsworth also played celesta on Björk's cover of Joni Mitchell's "The Boho Dance"; the celesta later became a feature on both Selmasongs (where he also contributed a string arrangement) and Vespertine, on which he co-wrote "Hidden Place", "An Echo, A Stain", "Sun in My Mouth", and "Harm of Will".

Imogen Heap
Sigsworth first met Imogen Heap in 1996 after a friend played him a demo of her song "Come Here Boy". He immediately fell in love with her distinctive voice. He was also amazed to hear that she shared his idiosyncratic love of melodies featuring wide, angular intervals—especially major 7ths and minor 9ths—which are not so common in pop. They wrote two songs together, "Getting Scared" and "Airplane", which Sigsworth produced for her debut album, I Megaphone. In return, Heap sang backing vocals on Sigsworth's band project with Alexander Nilere, Acacia.

G:MT
In 1999, Sigsworth scored the movie G:MT - Greenwich Mean Time, which included musical contributions from Imogen Heap, Talvin Singh, and free jazz virtuoso Lester Bowie.

Madonna
Sigsworth co-produced the 1998 Mandalay album Empathy, which attracted the attention of Madonna. This in turn led to him co-writing the song "What It Feels Like for a Girl" with Madonna and David Torn, for her 2000 album Music. Sigsworth also wrote the song "Nothing Fails" with Jem for Madonna's 2003 album American Life.

Frou Frou

One night in Mumbai, India, where he was producing a song for British artist Amar, Sigsworth composed a tune on his Yamaha QY20 pocket sequencer. As soon as he arrived back in London, he took it to Imogen Heap, and asked her to write a top line for it. It became "Flicks", their first song for what would become the Frou Frou album Details. Originally, there was no plan for Sigsworth and Heap to form a band. It was simply a matter of Sigsworth wanting to hear various song ideas properly realized. As Heap said: "Every month or so, Guy would phone me up and say 'I've got a new song, would you come in and sing it?', and then before we knew it, we'd already started the album."

As a linking concept for the emerging set of songs, Sigsworth suggested two ideas for the lyrics:
 They should feel like one half of a conversation rather than singer-on-a-soapbox declarations. Sigsworth's inspiration for this was the 1932 Jean Cocteau play La voix humaine (the entire text of the play consists of one side of a telephone conversation between a woman and her former lover. Her lover's words are never heard but are inferred from her words).
 The word "love" should be used as often as possible.

Sigsworth wrote the lyrics to the songs "Breathe In", "Only Got One", and "The Dumbing Down of Love", and co-wrote the lyrics to "Let Go", "It's Good to Be in Love", and "Psychobabble" on Details. Heap wrote the remaining lyrics, apart from "Maddening Shroud", which was texted by Alexander Nilere.

After eleven songs had been completed, Heap and Sigsworth set about finding a name for their collaborative effort. Sigsworth, a fan of all things French, came up with "Frou Frou", which Heap loved. The name comes from Rimbaud's 1870 poem "Ma Bohème", and is a French onomatopoeic word originally meaning the swishing noise made by skirts on dancing women. The album title, "Details", was a reference to the way the songs were constructed in the studio, by layering momentary details of sounds and performances to create a web of sound.

The album was released in 2002 on Universal Records. It was critically acclaimed, but did not achieve mass sales. "Breathe In" was released as the first single internationally, and reached number two on the Italian radio airplay charts, but follow-up singles "Must Be Dreaming" and "It's Good to Be in Love" were never commercially released in the UK. A video was also made for "The Dumbing Down of Love", directed by Joel Peissig (who later directed Heap's solo video "Hide and Seek"). After touring the record extensively across the United States, where the duo had established a cult fan base, Frou Frou disbanded in 2003.

Heap and Sigsworth temporarily reformed Frou Frou to record a cover version of "Holding Out for a Hero", originally recorded by Bonnie Tyler, for the Shrek 2 soundtrack. The duo were approached by the music director of the film, who had been a fan of their album. The resulting track is played during the end credits of the film. Frou Frou also experienced a resurgence in popularity in 2004, when Scrubs star Zach Braff chose album track "Let Go" for his independent film Garden State. Other Frou Frou tracks have been included on television series, such as CSI: Crime Scene Investigation and Roswell High.

Post-Frou Frou

Since Frou Frou, Sigsworth has returned to producing and co-writing for other artists.

Chelsia Chan
Sigsworth has remixed a song by Hong Kong-based actress and singer-songwriter Chelsia Chan. The song's lyrics are a Mandarin-language adaptation of a poem by Elizabeth Barrett Browning.

Bebel Gilberto
Sigsworth has contributed to two albums for Brazilian artist Bebel Gilberto, co-writing and producing the song "Cada Beijo" and remixing the song "O Caminho" for her 2004 album Bebel Gilberto. He also produced five songs for her 2007 album Momento.

Josh Groban
Sigsworth produced the vocals on Josh Groban's single "You Are Loved", taken from his 2006 album Awake.

Kate Havnevik
Sigsworth has worked extensively with Norwegian singer-songwriter Kate Havnevik. On her first album, Melankton (2006), he co-wrote and produced four tracks, including the single "Unlike Me" (which was featured in an a cappella version on the US hit TV show Grey's Anatomy, along with "Kaleidoscope"), "Not Fair", "Kaleidoscope", and "You Again". Another Sigsworth collaboration, entitled "So:Lo", was released on iTunes in late 2006, and appeared on the US version of Melankton in 2007, and was also used in Grey's Anatomy. Sigsworth produced and co-wrote Kate's second album, You, released in 2012, with songs like "Halo", also used in Grey's Anatomy.

Juliet
Sigsworth co-wrote and produced the song "New Shoes" for Juliet's 2005 album Random Order.

Mirah
Sigsworth has remixed Mirah's song "La Familia" for her 2006 collection Joyride: Remixes.

Alanis Morissette

Sigsworth produced and co-wrote the music for the entire 2008 Alanis Morissette album Flavors of Entanglement and for some of the music on her 2012 album Havoc and Bright Lights. On Havoc, he both produced songs independently and co-produced them with Joe Chiccarelli and Morissette.

VersaEmerge
Sigsworth collaborated with VersaEmerge on the intro music for their song "Up There" from the album Fixed at Zero. It was mentioned in an interview that this was the first internet writing session either of the artists had taken part in, collaborating internationally via Skype.

Alison Moyet
Sigworth co-wrote and produced all the songs recorded for Alison Moyet's 2013 album The Minutes and the 2017 follow-up album Other.

Mozez
Sigsworth co-wrote and produced two songs for former Zero 7 singer Mozez's 2005 album So Still: "Feel Free" and "Venus Rise". "Venus Rise" features a trumpet performance by Jon Hassell.

Robyn
Sigsworth produced two songs for Robyn's 2002 album Don't Stop the Music: "Should Have Known" and "Blow My Mind".

Britney Spears
Sigsworth has produced several tracks for Britney Spears. The first, "Everytime", appeared on her album In the Zone. The song reached number one on the UK and Australian singles charts, and number fifteen on the US Billboard Hot 100. A track Imogen Heap and Sigsworth had worked on for the In the Zone album entitled "Over to You Now" was also released on the UK and Japanese bonus EP Chaotic of the DVD release of her reality TV show, Britney & Kevin: Chaotic, as well as on the Japanese "Someday (I Will Understand)" single. Sigsworth produced the song "Out from Under" and co-wrote and produced the song "My Baby" for Spears' 2008 album Circus.

Amy Studt
Sigsworth produced and co-wrote the song "My Paper Made Man" for Amy Studt's 2008 album My Paper Made Men.

Sugababes / Mutya Buena
Sigsworth worked on two albums for the UK group Sugababes. He co-wrote and produced the song "Maya" for their 2003 album Three, and the song "Bruised" for their 2005 album Taller in More Ways, (co-written with Cathy Dennis). The song "Like the Weather", also co-written with Dennis, appears on the B-side of the song "Push the Button". Sigsworth also produced the song "Wonderful" for ex-Sugababe Mutya Buena's solo album Real Girl.

David Sylvian
Sigsworth remixed David Sylvian's song "Godman", from the 1999 album Dead Bees on a Cake.

Temposhark
Sigsworth produced the song "It's Better to Have Loved" and co-wrote and produced the song "Winter's Coming" for Temposhark's 2008 debut album The Invisible Line. Sigsworth's former engineer and collaborator Sean McGhee produced nine songs on the album.

Richard Walters
Sigsworth co-wrote and produced three songs for Richard Walters' 2006 Pilotlights EP: "Elephant in the Room", "Iceskaters", and "Garden Song".

Vanessa Williams
Sigsworth wrote a song called "Closer to You" with Bebel Gilberto and produced it for Vanessa L. Williams' eighth studio album, The Real Thing.

Eric Whitacre
Sigsworth produced Eric Whitacre's song "Virtual Choir #4: Fly to Paradise", as well as playing the keyboard and electronica on the track.

Discography

Production/songwriting/performance credits

 Seal Seal (1991)
 "Crazy" (co-written/production)
 "The Beginning" (co-written)
 "Wild" (co-written)
 "Violet" (co-written)
 Bomb the Bass Winter in July (1991)
 "Winter in July" (samples/production/keyboards)
 Bomb the Bass The Air You Breathe (1991)
 The Air You Breathe" (Real Mellow Mix) (remix/additional production)
 Bomb the Bass Love So True (1991)
 "Love So True" (12" Mix) (keyboards/additional keyboards)
 Bomb the Bass Unknown Territory (1991)
 "Winter in July" (7" Mix) (samples/production/keyboards)
 "The Air You Breathe" (keyboards)
 "Love So True" (12" Mix) (keyboards)
 Adamski & Jimi Polo Never Goin' Down! (12 inch vinyl) (1991)
 "Born to Be Alive!" (Spike's Edit) (additional programming)
 Adamski Naughty (1992)
 "Born to Be Alive!" (programming)
 "Time Capsule" (programming)
 "Newsflash" (programming)
 "Head-on-Collision-Ism" (programming)
 Hector Zazou Sahara Blue (1992)
 Hector Zazou I'll Strangle You (1992)
 "I'll Strangle You" (Radio Edit) (keyboards)
 "I'll Strangle You" (Extended Remix) (keyboards)
 "I'll Strangle You" (Filmic Mix) (keyboards)
 Naked Truth Read This (EP) (1992) (production)
 Bomb the Bass "Keep Giving Me Love" (single) (1992) (keyboards)
 Nokko Call Me Nightlife (1993)
 "Crazy Clouds" (keyboards)
 Acacia Maddening Shroud (EP) (1994) (co-written/production/co-instrumentation)
 Acacia "The More You Ignore Me, the Closer I Get" (Vinyl single) (1994) (co-written/production/co-instrumentation)
 Hector Zazou Sahara Blue (1994) (keyboards)
 Hector Zazou Chansons des mers froides (1995) (keyboards)
 Björk Post (1995)
 "Cover Me" (harpsichord)
 "Isobel" (harpsichord)
 Björk Homogenic (1997)
 "Unravel" (co-written/co-production)
 "All Is Full of Love" (clavichord/keyboards/pipe organ)
 "All Is Full of Love" (Guy Sigsworth Remix) (production) ("All Is Full of Love" B-side)
 Acacia "Hate" (single) (1996)(co-written/production/co-instrumentation/remixes)
 Acacia "Sway" (single) (1996) (co-written/production/co-instrumentation/remixes)
 Acacia "Maddening Shroud" (single) (1997) (co-written/production/co-instrumentation/remixes)
 Acacia "Wired" (single) (1997)(co-written/production/co-instrumentation/remixes)
 Acacia Cradle (1997)
 All album tracks (co-written/production/co-instrumentation)
 Imogen Heap I Megaphone (1998)
 "Getting Scared" (co-written/production)
 "Airplane" (co-writing/production) ("Shine" B-side)
 "Aeroplane" (Frou Frou Remix) (co-written/production) (Japan re-release bonus track)
 G:MT "Greenwich Mean Time OST (1998)
 G:MT & Imogen Heap "Meantime" (written/production/instrumentation)
 G:MT & Hinda Hicks "Tears Are Waiting" (written/production/co-instrumentation)
 G:MT & Hinda Hicks "Where Is the Love" (written/production/co-instrumentation)
 G:MT & Hinda Hicks "Please Can I Go Now?" (written/production/co-instrumentation)
 G:MT & Hinda Hicks "Who Would You Have Me Love" (written/production/co-instrumentation)
 G:MT & Hinda Hicks "Succumb to You" (written/production/co-instrumentation)
 G:MT & Lester Bowie "Rachel's Song" (instrumental)(written/production/co-instrumentation)
 Mandalay Empathy (1998)
 "This Life" (co-production/rhodes/sampler/synth/wurlitzer/piano)
 "Flowers Bloom" (co-production/rhodes/sampler/synth/wurlitzer/piano)
 "Insensible" (co-production/rhodes/sampler/synth/wurlitzer/piano)
 "Another" (co-production/rhodes/sampler/synth/wurlitzer/piano)
 "Enough Love" (co-production/rhodes/sampler/synth/wurlitzer/piano)
 "All My Sins" (co-production/rhodes/sampler/synth/wurlitzer/piano)
 "Opposites" (co-production/rhodes/sampler/synth/wurlitzer/piano)
 "This Time" (co-production/rhodes/sampler/synth/wurlitzer/piano)
 "Kissing the Day" (co-production/rhodes/sampler/synth/wurlitzer/piano)
 "Beautiful" (co-production/rhodes/sampler/synth/wurlitzer/piano)
 "About You" (co-production/rhodes/sampler/synth/wurlitzer/piano)
 Badmarsh & Shri "The Air I Breathe" (single) (1998)
 Goldie Saturnz Return (1998)
 "Mother" (keyboards)
 Talvin Singh OK (1998)
 "Sutrix" (sound effects (distortion)/keyboards)
 "OK" (sound effects (distortion)/keyboards)
  "Vikram the Vampire" (Heavy Rotation Refixx) (remix/additional production)
 David Sylvian "God Man" (Guy Sigsworth Remix) (remix/additional production/additional instrumentation) (1999)
 UNKLE featuring Ian Brown "Be There" (1999) (co-producer/mellotron)
 Björk Selmasongs (2000)
 "I've Seen It All" (co-written)
 Madonna Music (2000)
 "What It Feels Like for a Girl" (co-written/co-production)
 Amar "Sometimes It Snows in April" (2000) (production)
 Björk Vespertine (2001)
 "Hidden Place" (programming/choir arrangement)
 "It's Not up to You" (celeste, clavichord)
 "An Echo, a Stain" (co-written/programming/celeste/choir arrangement)
 "Sun in My Mouth" (co-written/celeste)
 Mandalay Solace (2001) (USA-only compilation featuring tracks from 1998's Empathy)
 "Beautiful" (co-production/rhodes/sampler/synth/wurlitzer/piano)
 "This Life" (co-production/rhodes/sampler/synth/wurlitzer/piano)
 "Flowers Bloom" (co-production/rhodes/sampler/synth/wurlitzer/piano)
 "Enough Love" (co-production/rhodes/sampler/synth/wurlitzer/piano)
 "Insensible" (co-production/rhodes/sampler/synth/wurlitzer/piano)
 "Kissing the Day" (co-production/rhodes/sampler/synth/wurlitzer/piano)
 Lamb What Sound (2001)
 "One" (co-production/programming)
 "Heaven" (co-production/programming)
 "Small" (co-production/programming)
 "Written" (co-production/programming)
 "Gabriel" (co-production/programming)
 "Just Is" (co-production/programming)
 Robyn Don't Stop the Music (2002)
 "Blow My Mind" (production/instrumentation)
 "Should Have Known" (production/instrumentation)
 Frou Frou Details (2002)
 "Let Go" (co-written/co-production/co-instrumentation)
 "Breathe In" (co-written/co-production/co-instrumentation)
 "It's Good to Be in Love" (co-written/co-production/co-instrumentation)
 "Must Be Dreaming" (co-written/co-production/co-instrumentation)
 "Psycobabble" (co-written/co-production/co-instrumentation)
 "Only Got One" (co-written/co-production/co-instrumentation)
 "Shh" (co-written/co-production/co-instrumentation)
 "Hear Me Out" (co-written/co-production/co-instrumentation)
 "Maddening Shroud" (co-written/co-production/co-instrumentation)
 "Flicks" (co-written/co-production/co-instrumentation)
 "The Dumbing Down of Love" (co-written/co-production/co-instrumentation)
 "Old Piano" (co-written/co-production/co-instrumentation) (Details UK/Japan bonus track)
 "Close Up" (co-written/co-production/co-instrumentation) ("Breathe In" B-side)
 "Deal With It" (co-written/co-production/co-instrumentation) (Was to be on the "It's Good To Be in Love" single, but was never released)
 "Guitar Song" (co-written/co-production/co-instrumentation) (unreleased)
 Baz Psychedelic Love (2002) (production)
 Madonna American Life (2003)
 "Nothing Fails" (co-written)
 Britney Spears In the Zone (2003)
 "Everytime" (production/instrumentation)
 Sugababes Three (2003)
 "Maya" (co-written/production)
 "Million Different Ways" (production)
 Shrek 2 OST (2004)
 "Holding Out for a Hero" (co-production/co-instrumentation)
 Bebel Gilberto Bebel Gilberto (2004)
 "Cada Beijo" (co-written/production)
 Juliet Random Order (2005)
 "New Shoes" (co-written/production)
 Bebel Gilberto Bebel Gilberto Remixed (2005)
 "O Caminho" (Guy Sigsworth Remix) (remix/additional production/additional instrumentation)
 Britney Spears Britney & Kevin: Chaotic (2005)
 "Someday (I Will Understand)" (production/instrumentation)
 "Over to You Now" (co-written/production/instrumentation) (UK/Japan only)
 Sugababes Taller in More Ways (2005)
 "Bruised" (co-written/production/instrumentation)
 "Like the Weather" (co-written/production/instrumentation) ("Push The Button" B-side)
 Mozez So Still (2005)
 "Feel Free" (co-written/production/instrumentation)
 "Venus Rise" (co-written/production/instrumentation)
 Temposhark It's Better to Have Loved (2005)
 "It's Better to Have Loved" (Guy Sigsworth Mix) (production/instrumentation)
 Kate Havnevik Melankton (2006/2007)
 "Unlike Me" (co-written/production/instrumentation)
 "Not Fair" (co-written/production/instrumentation)
 "You Again" (co-written/production/instrumentation)
 "Kaleidoscope" (production/instrumentation/mixing)
 "Sleepless" (co-written/production/instrumentation)
 "So:Lo" (production/co-written) (USA & iTunes only)
 Josh Groban Awake (2006)
 "You Are Loved (Don't Give Up)" (vocal production)
 Mirah Joyride: Remixes (2006)
 "La Familia" (Guy Sigsworth Remix) (remix/additional production)
 Bebel Gilberto Momento (2007)
 "Momento" (production/instrumentation)
 "Cade Voce" (co-written/production/instrumentation)
 "Azul" (co-written/production/instrumentation)
 "Close to You" (co-written/production/instrumentation)
 Mutya Buena Real Girl (2007)
 "Wonderful" (production)
 Temposhark The Invisible Line (2007)
 "It's Better to Have Loved" (Album version) (production/instrumentation)
 "Winter's Coming" (co-written/production/instrumentation)
 Amy Studt My Paper Made Men (2008)
 Paper Made Men (co-written/production/instrumentation)
 Alanis Morissette Flavors of Entanglement (+ B-sides) (2008)
 "Citizen of the Planet"
 "Underneath"
 "Versions of Violence"
 "Moratorium"
 "Giggling Again for No Reason"
 "In Praise of the Vulnerable Man"
 "Straitjacket"
 "On the Tequila"
 "Tapes"
 "Incomplete"
 "Not As We"
 "Torch"
 "20/20"
 "Limbo No More"
 "The Guy Who Leaves"
 "Madness"
 "Orchid"
 "It's a Bitch to Grow Up"
 "Break"
 "Asylum" (unreleased)
 "I Am" (unreleased)
 "Wounded Leading Wounded" (unreleased)
 "Separate" (unreleased)
 Britney Spears Circus (2008)
 "Out from Under"
 "My Baby"
 Kate Havnevik Me (2009)
 "Show Me Love" (co-written/production)
 "Halo" (co-written/production)
 "Think Again" (co-written/production)
 "Disobey" (co-written/production)
 "Soon" (co-written/production)
 Alanis Morissette, Havoc and Bright Lights (+ B-sides) (2012)
 "Into a King" (co-written/production)
 "Guardian" (co-written/additional production/keys)
 "Woman Down" (co-written/co-production/keys/drum programming)
 "'Til You" (co-written/keys)
 "Celebrity" (co-written/co-production/keys/drum programming)
 "Empathy" (co-written)
 "Lens" (co-written/additional production/keys)
 "Spiral" (co-written/additional production/keys)
 "Numb" (co-written/keys/drum programming)
 "Havoc" (co-written/co-production/keys)
 "Win and Win" (co-written/keys)
 "Receive" (co-written)
 "Edge of Evolution" (co-written/keys)
 "Will You Be My Girlfriend?" (co-written/additional production)
 "Magical Child" (co-written/additional production)
 "Big Sur" (co-written/additional production)
 "Guru" (co-written/production)
 "Permission" (co-written/production)
 "No" (co-written/production)
 "Tantra" (co-written/production)
 "Jekyll and Hyde" (co-written/production)
 "Naysayers" (co-written/production)(leaked)
 SingerSen Sirens EP (2011)
 "Drunk"
 "Sirens"
 "Snow Queen"
 SingerSen The World in My Eyes (2012)
 "Shadows"
 "Cable"
 "Shadows"
 "Ghost Street"
 "Heartbeats"
 Guy Sigsworth STET (2019)

References

External links
 
 

British electronic musicians
British record producers
English songwriters
British songwriters
People educated at Leeds Grammar School
Living people
Mercury KX artists
People from Ilkley
Year of birth missing (living people)